Steven Raga is an American politician and academic serving as a member of the New York State Assembly for the 30th district. Elected in November 2022, he assumed office on January 1, 2023.

Early life and education 
Raga was born and raised in the borough of Queens in New York City. He earned a Bachelor of Arts in political science and Master of Public Policy from Stony Brook University, a Master of Business Administration from the Samuel Curtis Johnson Graduate School of Management at Cornell University, a Master of Science in healthcare management from the Weill Cornell Graduate School of Medical Sciences, and a Master of Public Administration from Baruch College.

Career 
From 2005 to 2007, Raga worked as the national director of the Filipino Intercollegiate Networking Dialogue. From 2009 to 2011, he worked as a program fellow and legal research assistant at Cornell Law School. Raga was also the founder and director of the Pilipino American Unity for Progress. In 2012 and 2013, he was a program researcher at the Fordham University School of Law. From 2014 to 2017, he worked as an advisor and strategist at the AARP. Raga served as chief of staff for Assemblymember Brian Barnwell and was the Northeast regional manager of Susan G. Komen for the Cure in 2020 and 2021. Since 2022, he has been an associate instructor at Columbia University. Raga was elected to the New York State Assembly in November 2022.

References 

Living people
People from Queens, New York
Stony Brook University alumni
Samuel Curtis Johnson Graduate School of Management alumni
Cornell University alumni
Baruch College alumni
New York (state) Democrats
Year of birth missing (living people)